Adline Mewis Quadros Castelino (born 24 July 1998) is an Indian model and beauty pageant titleholder who was crowned as Miss Diva Universe 2020. She represented India at Miss Universe 2020, and was the third runner-up.

Early life and education
Castelino was born in Kuwait City to Mangalorean Catholic parents Alphonse and Meera Castellino. Her family hails from Udyavara in Udupi, Karnataka. Castelino attended the Indian Central School in Kuwait. At the age of fifteen, she returned to India and moved to Mumbai, where she attended St. Xavier's High School. Castelino later attended Wilson College. There she graduated with a degree in Business Administration. She is fluent in English and Hindi, besides her mother tongue Konkani.

Pageantry
Aside from working as a model, Castelino had participated in an online pageant in 2018. She further continued her training for pageants through the Cocoaberry Training Academy in Mumbai. In 2019, she was crowned as 'Miss Cocoaberry Diva' by the institution.

Miss Diva 2020 

In 2019, Castelino auditioned for the Miss Diva 2020 contest, through the Chennai auditions, and was shortlisted as a city finalist. In the culminating round of selections in Mumbai, she entered as one of the top 20 delegates. During the contest's sports round held in Bennett University, she won the "Miss Smasher" award, for her performance in badminton. On 22 February 2020, she was eventually crowned as Miss Diva Universe 2020 by the outgoing titleholder Vartika Singh at Yash Raj Studio, Andheri, Mumbai.

During the competition's final question and answer round, the top 5 contestants were each asked a common question by the host, Malaika Arora: "Does religion unite or divide people?" to which Castelino expressed:

Miss Universe 2020 
As the winner of Miss Diva 2020, Castelino represented India at the Miss Universe 2020 competition at Seminole Hard Rock Hotel & Casino, Hollywood, Florida, in the United States. During the grand finale event held on 16 May 2021, she initially made it to the Top 21, and subsequently she was selected as one of the top 10 semifinalists. Castelino further placed in the top 5, thus becoming the first Indian woman to reach the top 5 of Miss Universe since the year 2001.

As one of the finalists at the contest, Castelino was asked by one of the judges, Tatyana Orozco - "Should countries lockdown due to COVID-19 despite the strain on their economies or should they open their borders and risk a potential increase in infection rates?" Castelino replied by stating:

At the end of the event, Castelino was adjudged as the 3rd runner up, and Andrea Meza of Mexico eventually won the title. This was India's highest placement in Miss Universe since Lara Dutta won the title of Miss Universe 2000. Castelino broke the 20-year drought of India's non placement in the Top 5 of Miss Universe, which was previously achieved by Celina Jaitley, who was the 4th runner-up in 2001.

Philanthropy
Castelino works with a welfare organisation called ‘Vikas Sahayog Pratishthan’ (VSP) which functions to provide a sustainable livelihood for farmers, so as to curb farmers' suicides and inequality. She has raised money for the Child Help Foundation (CHF), through a crowd funding platform called Ketto. She has often advocated on spreading more awareness about the acceptance of LGBT community. She also advocates to encourage leadership qualities in women by conducting leadership programmes.

During the lockdown imposed due to the SARS-CoV-2 outbreak in 2020, she helped in providing essentials like food supplies, sanitizers and face masks for ‘Desire Society’, a non-profit voluntary organization that cares for children infected with HIV in India. On the occasion of Christmas the same year, she went as a Secret Santa to distribute gifts and spent time with the children supported by the Desire Society. She was able to raise and donate food grains and pulses, among other staples to the organization. During this visit, she expressed, "The first time I came to know about the Desire Society was when I was in college. I used visit here as a student to help out as a volunteer."

She supported Smile Train's campaign to end the stigma around COVID-19. She also initiated fundraisers for the Akshaya Patra Foundation, to help provide meals and packed grocery kits to the marginalized and low-income segment of the society, comprising daily wage workers, migrant laborers, people at old age homes and night shelters. Castelino, supporting this cause, expressed - "The spread of coronavirus has taken a lot from us, but let this pandemic not take away our humanity and ability to understand the needs of our brethren."

In August 2020, she associated with a campaign to spread awareness about polycystic ovary syndrome. She promoted a drive titled 'PCOS Free India' to help women reverse the condition naturally through some holistic wellness practices.

She organized fundraisers during 2021 so as to provide the donations to Agricultural Resource Centers. Through this, she aims to supply agricultural machineries like sowing equipments, petrol pump spray, sprinkler sets, ripper and thrasher units to Women Self-Help Groups, and train them to utilise these equipments.

Media 
Adline Castelino was ranked in The Times Most Desirable Women at No. 2 in 2020.

Filmography

Television

Music videos

References

1998 births
Living people
People from Kuwait City
People from Udupi
Indian beauty pageant winners
Indian female models
Female models from Mumbai
Miss Universe 2020 contestants
Indian expatriates in Kuwait
University of Mumbai alumni